Classic Media, LLC, doing business as DreamWorks Classics, is an American entertainment company owned by DreamWorks Animation, which is a subsidiary of Universal Pictures and a division of Comcast's NBCUniversal. It was founded as Classic Media in 2000 by Eric Ellenbogen and John Engelman. The studio's library consists of acquired intellectual property catalogs and character brands, as well as the licensing rights for various third-party properties. In 2012, Boomerang Media sold Classic Media to DreamWorks Animation, who rebranded the company as DreamWorks Classics. DreamWorks Animation became a subsidiary of NBCUniversal in 2016.

History

Classic Media (2000–2012)
Classic Media was founded by Eric Ellenbogen and John Engelman in May 2000 and acquired the UPA catalog from Henry Saperstein's estate. Frank Biondi, the former head of Universal Studios, and movie producer Steve Tisch invested in the company. Classic Media then bought the Harvey Entertainment catalog on March 11, 2001. On August 16, 2001, Classic Media and Random House won a joint bid for the assets of Golden Books, with Random House, and Classic Media acquiring Golden Books' entertainment division (including the Dell Comics and Gold Key Comics libraries) and Random House acquiring Golden Books' book publishing properties. On October 31, 2003, Classic Media purchased the assets of the bankrupt Big Idea Entertainment. By 2007, Classic had formed Bullwinkle Studios, a joint venture with Jay Ward Productions, to manage the Jay Ward characters.

On April 7, 2005, the company was recapitalized by a group of investors consisting of Spectrum Equity Investors plus existing investors led by Pegasus Capital Advisors. A $100 million senior debt facility was also arranged from JP Morgan Chase Bank-led bank group. With the deal, Spectrum became a majority owner over the existing investors, with a representative on the company board of directors.

In August 2006, Classic Media announced a joint venture with ION Media Networks, NBCUniversal, Corus Entertainment and book publisher Scholastic Corporation to launch Qubo, a kids' entertainment network.

On December 14, 2006, it was announced that Classic Media would be acquired by UK-based rival Entertainment Rights for $210.0 million. Before the acquisition was completed, both companies announced distribution and production agreements with Genius Products, LLC, replacing the Sony Wonder deal.

Entertainment Rights fell in to administration on April 1, 2009. On the same day, Boomerang Media LLC, formed by Ellenbogen and Engelman in 2008 with equity funding from GTCR, announced that it would acquire Entertainment Rights' principal UK and American subsidiaries, including Classic Media, Inc. and Big Idea Entertainment, from its administrators. On May 11, 2009, Boomerang Media announced that the former UK and American subsidiaries of Entertainment Rights would operate as a unified business under the name Classic Media, while Big Idea would operate under its own name.

On February 20, 2010, Classic Media purchased the then-upcoming manga-inspired television series My Life Me from the bankrupt TV-Loonland AG.

On March 7, 2012, Classic Media brought the Noddy brand from Chorion and later brought the Olivia brand from them on March 19.

DreamWorks Classics (2012–present)
On July 23, 2012, DreamWorks Animation acquired Classic Media from Boomerang Media for $155 million; the company became a unit of DreamWorks Animation and was renamed DreamWorks Classics. On June 18, 2014, DreamWorks Animation bought the  Felix the Cat brand and added it to the DreamWorks Classics portfolio. On April 28, 2016, NBCUniversal, a part of the Comcast group, announced a $3.8 billion deal to buy DreamWorks Animation. The acquisition was completed on August 22. Three series, Lassie, George of the Jungle and Mr. Magoo, were picked up from DreamWorks Classics' library by CBS All Access (Paramount Global's streaming service, now known as Paramount+) in January 2020.

Libraries

Catalogs
 The UPA catalog (Mr. Magoo and Gerald McBoing-Boing) including several Godzilla films under license from Toho
 The Harvey Films catalog (Casper the Friendly Ghost, Little Audrey, Richie Rich, and Baby Huey)
 The Western Publishing/Golden Books/Gold Key Comics/Golden Book Video catalog (Pat the Bunny, Magnus, Robot Fighter, Doctor Solar, Man of the Atom, Turok,  and Little Lulu), including:
 Broadway Video's former family entertainment catalog (Lassie, The Lone Ranger, and Sergeant Preston of the Yukon) including:
 The pre-September 1974 Rankin/Bass Productions catalog (Rudolph the Red-Nosed Reindeer, The Little Drummer Boy, Frosty the Snowman, Santa Claus Is Coming to Town, and others)
 The Total Television catalog (Underdog and Tennessee Tuxedo and His Tales)
 Shari Lewis' two PBS series (Lamb Chop's Play Along and Charlie Horse Music Pizza)
 The Big Idea Entertainment catalog (VeggieTales, 3-2-1 Penguins!, Larryboy: The Cartoon Adventures)
 The Entertainment Rights catalog, including:
 The Filmation catalog (The Archie Show, Fat Albert and the Cosby Kids, He-Man and the Masters of the Universe, and BraveStarr)
 The Woodland Animations catalog  (Postman Pat, Gran, Bertha and Charlie Chalk)
 The Tell-Tale Productions catalog (including Boo! but excluding the rights to Tweenies)
 The Sleepy Kids catalog  (Dr. Zitbag's Transylvania Pet Shop, Budgie the Little Helicopter and Potsworth & Co.)
 The Chapman Entertainment catalog (Fifi and the Flowertots, Roary the Racing Car, Little Charley Bear and Raa Raa the Noisy Lion)

Character brands
 Noddy
 Olivia
 Felix the Cat
 Where's Waldo?
 She-Ra (via the Filmation catalog; co-ownership with Mattel)
  Roger Ramjet

Joint ventures
 Bullwinkle Studios, a joint venture with Jay Ward Productions to produce and manage the Jay Ward catalog (including The Adventures of Rocky and Bullwinkle, Mr. Peabody & Sherman, and George of the Jungle). DreamWorks' partnership with Bullwinkle Studios ended in February 2022 when the Ward estate partnered with WildBrain. DreamWorks continues to own its co-productions with Bullwinkle Studios.

Other rights
 My Life Me
 Voltron (under license from World Events Productions)
 The Tribune Content Agency catalog (including Dick Tracy, Brenda Starr, Reporter, Gasoline Alley, and Broom-Hilda)
 OOglies (worldwide distribution excluding U.K. TV.)

References

External links
 

 
2000 establishments in New York City
2007 mergers and acquisitions
2009 mergers and acquisitions
2012 mergers and acquisitions
American companies established in 2000
DreamWorks Animation
Entertainment companies based in New York City
Mass media companies based in New York City
Mass media companies established in 2000